Lee Clow (born 1943) is the chairman and global director of TBWA\Worldwide, and had been its chief creative officer. Advertising Age referred to him as "advertising's art director guru".

Early life
Lee Clow was born in Los Angeles, California, US. He studied at Santa Monica City College and California State University, Long Beach.

Career
Clow is best known for co-creating – along with Steve Hayden – Apple Computer's 1984 commercial, which launched the Apple Macintosh and the "Think Different" slogan. The 60-second TV spot was made for a budget of $900,000 and is considered a masterpiece in advertising.

He is also known for his work on the PlayStation, Energizer Bunny, Taco Bell chihuahua, and California Cooler campaigns. Clow has helmed campaigns for Nissan and Pedigree Petfoods.  He is a member of numerous advertising and creative halls of fame.

Personal life
He was a personal friend of Steve Jobs for 30 years.

References

External links
Art Directors Club - biography, portrait and images of work (1990)
Ihaveanidea - interview with Lee Clow (2004)
Lee Clow's Beard - information on a Twitter-feed-turned-book featuring Lee Clow (2012)

Advertising directors
Apple Inc. advertising
Living people
1943 births